The 2014 Segunda División play-offs took place in June 2014 and has  determined the third team which will be promoted to the top division. Teams placed between 3rd and 6th position (excluding reserve teams) are taking part in the promotion play-offs.

The regulations are the same as the previous season: in the semifinals the fifth placed team faces the fourth, while the sixth placed team faces the third. In case of a draw, extra time  was played but there   was a penalty shoot-out; the winner will be the best positioned team. The first leg of the semi-finals was played on 11 June, and the second leg on 15 June at home of the best positioned team. The final will also be two-legged, with the first leg on 19 June and the second leg on 22 June, with the best positioned team also playing the second leg at home.

Road to the playoffs

League table

Overview
The two non-seeded teams, Córdoba and Las Palmas qualified for the final game. Both teams won away in the second leg of the round.

In the finals, a goal of Ulises Dávila in the 94th minute gave the promotion place to Córdoba CF. Just one minute before, the game was stopped due to an invasion of the pitch of several fans of Las Palmas, who wanted to celebrate the promotion before time.

After the playoffs, Real Murcia was relegated to Segunda División B due to financial irregularities.

Promotion play-offs

Semifinals

First leg

|valign="top"|

|valign="top"|

Second leg

|valign="top"|

|valign="top"|

Final

First leg

|valign="top"|

Second leg

|valign="top"|

References

External links
Segunda División at LFP website

2013-14
play-offs
1